Drag Pack was Ford Motor Company's marketing name for an option package available in the United States for some of its car models that included a remote mounted oil cooler and higher ratio rear axle gear (plus engine components on some models). This option is printed on the factory invoice as Drag Pack, Super Drag Pack, Drag Pak, or Super Drag Pak (the spelling "Pak" was used by the Lincoln/Mercury division of Ford).  The only known exception is a factory equipped Boss 302 Mustang with the Drag Pack option, which was not marketed by Ford as such, or by any other name.

At the start of the 1970 model year, Ford began installing the Drag Pack on approximately 10% of Boss 302 Mustangs. For those who were aware of it, this free Drag Pack upgrade was available simply by ordering a 4.30 rear axle ratio. The only known exceptions are two early production vehicles with 3.91 axle ratio (special factory orders which received the oil cooler), and two 4.30 axle ratio vehicles (which reportedly did not receive their intended oil cooler, possibly the result of a supply problem).  The 4.30 axle ratio exceptions are insignificant in terms of establishing a meaningful pattern, as they represent a normal (1970) production line margin of error.

Donald Farr's book, Mustang Boss 302, is considered to be the bible of Boss 302 Mustangs. Farr notes on page 78 that
"One engine performance option remained a mystery since Ford failed to publish any information about its availability, although many cars were so equipped. The engine oil cooler, a known Drag Pack option for the 428 Cobra Jet, was frequently found on Boss 302 Mustangs although listed as not available for the Boss 302 in Ford literature. However, it appears that many Boss 302s were factory equipped with a Drag Pack option."

References

Ford Motor Company